Agent is an upcoming Indian Telugu-language spy action thriller film directed by Surender Reddy from a story written by Vakkantham Vamsi. It stars Akhil Akkineni, Mammootty , Sakshi Vaidya, Dino Morea And Vikramjeet Virk.

Agent was announced in September 2020. Filming took place in Hyderabad, Budapest, Visakhapatnam and Manali. The film's release has been deferred multiple times due to the COVID-19 pandemic and production delays. Agent is now scheduled for a theatrical release on 28 April 2023.

Premise 
The government tasks Colonel Mahadev, the head of NSC, to capture a rogue agent known to be ruthless and unpredictable.

Cast 

 Akhil Akkineni
 Mammootty as Colonel Mahadev 
 Sakshi Vaidya
 Dino Morea
 Vikramjeet Virk

Production

Development 
The film was announced by Akhil Akkineni in September 2020, tentatively titled Akhil 5, with Surender Reddy as the director. It was officially launched on Akkineni's birthday in April 2021, revealing the title and posters. A pooja ceremony was held on the launch day.

Casting 
Akkineni's role as a spy was reportedly inspired by the character of Jason Bourne from the American-German film series Bourne. Akkineni bulked up his body for the role. In December 2020, model Sakshi Vaidya was confirmed as the female lead. In March 2021, Mohanlal and Upendra were approached for a pivotal role which did not finalize. In June 2021, Mammootty was approached for playing a pivotal role  which was confirmed he joined the set by June 21, marking the first collaboration between Mammootty, Akkineni and Reddy. His character is a military officer.

Filming 
Filming began in July 2021 in Hyderabad, India. Mammootty joined the production in October 2021 in Budapest and completed filming his portions. In March 2022, sequences featuring Akkineni were shot in Hyderabad Metro. The following month, the production moved to Visakhapatnam and shot a few actions episodes and a song at the Visakhapatnam Port. In April 2022, the production moved to Manali, Himachal Pradesh to shoot action sequences featuring Akkineni and others, under the choreographer of Vijay Master. As of May 2022, about 50-60% of the production has been completed due to delays in production, thus missing the August 2022 release.

Music 
The music rights of the film is owned by Lahari Music and T Series. Earlier Thaman S was chosen as the composer of the film's score and soundtrack. Later, in September 2021, Thaman has been replaced by Tamil musical duo Hiphop Tamizha. The first single titled "Malli Malli" was released on 22 February 2023.

Release 
Agent is schdeduled to be released on 28 April 2023. Initially, the film was initially scheduled for a release on 24 December 2021, but the film's production was heavily delayed due to the COVID-19 pandemic.

Later, the film was scheduled to release on 12 August 2022 but was delayed again due to production delays and Akkineni's injuries. The film was then planned for a January 2023 release coinciding with the Sankranti festival before being postponed to the current date. The film is set to release in Telugu along with the dubbed versions in Hindi, Tamil, Kannada and Malayalam languages.

References

External links 
 

Upcoming films
Upcoming Telugu-language films
Upcoming Indian films
Indian spy thriller films
Films directed by Surender Reddy
Films shot in Hyderabad, India
Films shot in Budapest
Films scored by Hiphop Tamizha
2022 thriller films
Film productions suspended due to the COVID-19 pandemic
Films postponed due to the COVID-19 pandemic